Pseudochromis elongatus, the elongate dottyback', is a species of ray-finned fish from the Western Pacific which is a member of the family Pseudochromidae. It occasionally makes its way into the aquarium trade. It grows to a size of 6.5 cm in length.

References

elongatus
Fish described in 1980